Kheli is a rural locality (a selo) and the administrative centre of Kheli-Penzhinsky Selsoviet, Tabasaransky District, Republic of Dagestan, Russia. The population was 575 as of 2010.

Geography 
Kheli is located 13 km east of Khuchni (the district's administrative centre) by road.

References 

Rural localities in Tabasaransky District